The 2012 Metro Atlantic Athletic Conference men's soccer tournament was the conference's 24th edition of the tournament. The tournament began on November 8 and ended on November 10. 

The Fairfield Stags were the defending champions. For the 2012 edition of the tournament, the field size was reduced from 10 participants to four. The winner was Niagara University.

Qualification

Bracket

Schedule

Semifinals

MAAC Championship

Statistical leaders

See also 
 Metro Atlantic Athletic Conference
 2012 in American soccer
 2012 NCAA Division I men's soccer season
 2012 NCAA Division I Men's Soccer Championship

References

External links 
 MAAC Tournament Information

2012 NCAA Division I men's soccer season
Metro Atlantic Athletic Conference men's soccer
MAAC Men's Soccer T
MAAC Men's Soccer Tournament